Knut Hanselmann (14 March 1946 – 31 December 2022) was a Norwegian politician for the Progress Party.

Hanselmann was elected to the Norwegian Parliament from Hordaland in 1989, but was not re-elected in 1993. He had previously served in the position of deputy representative during the term 1981–1985. Hanselmann was also involved in local politics in Bergen and Askøy. In 2007 he became the mayor of Askøy. From 1987 to 1989 he was also a member of Hordaland county council. He left the Norwegian Parliamentary Intelligence Oversight Committee in 2011.

Hanselmann died of cancer on 31 December 2022, at the age of 76.

References

1946 births
2022 deaths
Members of the Storting
Progress Party (Norway) politicians
Politicians from Bergen
Mayors of Askøy
People from Askøy
20th-century Norwegian politicians